Chakunda urf milki is a Gram panchayat in hajipur,  vaishali district, bihar.

Chakunda Urf Milki is surrounded by Rajapakar Block towards East , Sonepur Block towards west , Bidupur Block towards East , Bhagwanpur Block towards North .

Geography
This panchayat is located at

Panchayat office
samudayik bhawan chakunda urf milki (समुदाियक भवन chakunda urf milki )

Nearest City/Town
Hajipur (Distance 15 km)

patna (Distance 22km)

Nearest major road highway or river
roadway  (milki rd)

NH31

NH922 

Ganges in the nearest river .

compass

Villages in panchayat
There are  villages in this panchayat

References

Gram panchayats in Bihar
Villages in Vaishali district
Vaishali district
Hajipur